The Cologne-Weidenpesch Racecourse (Galopprennbahn Köln-Weidenpesch) is a horse racing track at Weidenpescher Park in Nippes, Cologne. As the only race course in Germany hosting more than one European pattern Group 1 race, Weidenpesch is one of the most prominent tracks in the country.

Cologne-Weidenpesch is also one of Germany's oldest horse-racing tracks, having been established as a race course in 1897. The larger of the two grandstands was designed as a cast iron and timber framing structure in 1898 and substantially renovated in 2004. Until recently, the sportsgrounds were also home to Cologne's oldest football club, the VfL Köln 99.

Races 
The Weidenpesch Racecourse hosts several annual conditions races: 

 Group 1:
 Preis von Europa and
 Rheinland-Pokal
 Group 2:
 Gerling-Preis,
 Grosse Europa-Meile,
 Mehl-Mülhens-Rennen and
 Oppenheim-Union-Rennen
 Group 3:
 Schwarzgold-Rennen,
 Silberne Peitsche and
 Preis des Winterfavoriten

The Gerling-Preis, originally established as "Preis von Birlinghoven" in 1921, and from 1934 onwards, named and sponsored by Robert Gerling, is the oldest sponsored race prize in the country. Other major races include the Preis von Europa and the Mehl-Mülhens-Rennen. The Cologne racing association (Kölner Rennverein) organizes horse races throughout the entire year.

See also 
 List of German flat horse races

References

External links 

 official site: Kölner Rennverein 1897 e.V.
 

Cologne
Sports venues in Cologne
Tourist attractions in Cologne
Nippes, Cologne